Michael Gallagher (born August 7, 1994) is an American soccer player who most recently played for LA Galaxy II in the USL Championship.

Career

Youth, College and Amateur
Gallagher played club soccer for the Crossfire Premier Academy and the Seattle Sounders FC Academy before spending his entire college career at the University of Washington.  In his four years with the Huskies, he made a total of 69 appearances and tallied three goals and two assists.

He also played in the Premier Development League for Seattle Sounders FC U-23 and Washington Crossfire.

Professional
On March 18, 2016, Gallagher signed a professional contract with USL club Portland Timbers 2.  He made his professional debut a week later in a 2–1 defeat to Swope Park Rangers.
On February 14, 2019 he signed with the LA Galaxy II.

References

External links
T2 bio
Washington Huskies bio

1994 births
Living people
American soccer players
Association football defenders
People from Sammamish, Washington
Portland Timbers 2 players
Real Monarchs players
LA Galaxy II players
Seattle Sounders FC U-23 players
Soccer players from Washington (state)
USL Championship players
USL League Two players
Washington Crossfire players
Washington Huskies men's soccer players